Hermeuptychia intricata is a butterfly of the family Nymphalidae. It has been recorded from the coastal plains of the eastern United States and is currently documented from Texas, Louisiana, Florida, South Carolina, and North Carolina.

The length of the forewings is 16.5 mm.

Etymology
The species name refers to the difficulty in recognizing this very distinct species and its intricate ventral wing patterns.

References

Butterflies described in 2014
Euptychiina